Charles L. Peterson (April 5, 1927 – June 2, 2022), also known as Chick Peterson, was an American artist known for watercolor paintings and for maritime artwork. He was also known for painting ghosts that are not in watercolor, but were placed within otherwise watercolor paintings.

Peterson graduated from Elgin High School in 1945 and attended the American Academy of Art College in Chicago and Marietta College in Ohio. After serving in the navy in the South Pacific, he was a professor at Concord University in West Virginia and also was a faculty member at Marietta College. He worked in the limited edition print industry.

After retiring from the limited edition print industry, Peterson continued to paint daily and designed work specifically for reproduction. He also worked on commission for private or corporate interests. Peterson died on June 2, 2022, at his home in Ephraim.

Publications
Of Time and Place (White Door Publishing Co., 1994)
Reflections (White Door Publishing Co., 2001)

Exhibition
Anderson House Work Bench in Ephraim, Door County, Wisconsin
Cottage Row Framing and Gallery in Fish Creek, Door County, Wisconsin
Maritime Gallery at Mystic Seaport in Mystic, Connecticut

Example of Peterson's work

References

Sources

External links
 Charles L. Petersion Biography – Country Art
 Charles L. Peterson Bio and Prints – Prints.com
 Recent Art Show – Cottage Row Gallery
 Charles L. Peterson Biography – Christ Centered Art
 Charles L. Peterson Biography – Mapleleaf Gallery
 Charles L. Peterson – Fine Art at World Wide Art
 Charles L. Peterson, Hall of Honor Award – Marietta College
 Portrait photograph of Peterson in 2020, markkauzlarich.com
 An Uncommon Father's Day Journey for a Merganser Family by Roy and Charlotte Lukes, Peninsula Pulse July 2, 2009

1927 births
2022 deaths
Artists from Illinois
Artists from Wisconsin
People from Door County, Wisconsin
People from Elgin, Illinois